Caledonia is a Roman name of Celtic origin for most of the area that has become Scotland.

Caledonia may also refer to:
 Caledonia, an old name for Scotland
 Caledonians, also known as Caledonii or Caledonia Confederacy, name given by historians to the Iron Age indigenous people of Scotland

Places

Canada

Nova Scotia
 Caledonia, Nova Scotia (disambiguation)
 Caledonia, Nova Scotia, village in Canada
 Caledonia (St. Marys), Nova Scotia
 Caledonia Mills, community in Antigonish County, Nova Scotia
 Port Caledonia, community in Nova Scotia

Other
 Caledonia, Cape Breton
 Caledonia, New Brunswick
 Caledonia, Ontario
 Caledonia land dispute, also known as the Grand River land dispute
 Caledonia Mountain, mountain on the border of Alberta and British Columbia
 New Caledonia (Canada), former North American fur-trading district
 Rural Municipality of Caledonia No. 99, Saskatchewan

United States
 Caledonia, Arkansas, an unincorporated community
 Caledonia, Illinois, a village
 Caledonia, Indiana, a ghost town
 Caledonia, Kentucky
 Caledonia, Michigan, a village
 Caledonia, Minnesota, a city
 Caledonia, Mississippi, a town
 Caledonia, Missouri, a village
 Caledonia, New York, a town
 Caledonia (village), New York
 Caledonia, North Dakota
 Caledonia, Ohio, a village
 Caledonia, Wisconsin, multiple locations
 Caledonia, Columbia County, Wisconsin, a town
 Caledonia, Racine County, Wisconsin, a village
 Caledonia, Trempealeau County, Wisconsin, a town
 Caledonia, Waupaca County, Wisconsin, a town
 Caledonia County, Vermont
 Caledonia Township, Illinois
 Caledonia Township, Alcona County, Michigan
 Caledonia Township, Kent County, Michigan
 Caledonia Township, Shiawassee County, Michigan
 Caledonia Township, Houston County, Minnesota

Other locations
 Caledonia Cascade, waterfall in Rabun County, Georgia, USA
 Caledonia Island, in Trinidad and Tobago
 Caledonia State Park, Pennsylvania, USA
 Caledonian Canal, a canal in Scotland which connects the east and west coasts
 Caledonian Forest, former woodland forest in the highlands of Scotland
 Caledonian Ocean, archaic name for the north Atlantic Ocean
 New Caledonia, a group of islands in the Pacific Ocean
 New Caledonia, a short-lived Scottish colony established by the Darien scheme in what is now Panama

Music

Albums 
 Caledonia (Alan Roberts and Dougie MacLean album), 1978
 Caledonia, an album by Shana Morrison, 1998
 Caledonia (Suidakra album), 2006

Songs 
 "Caledonia" (song), a 1979 song by Dougie MacLean, covered by Frankie Miller and many others
 "Caldonia" or "Caledonia", a 1945 song by Louis Jordan and his Tympany Five, covered by many others
 "Caledonia", a song by Cromagnon from their 1969 album Orgasm
 "Caledonia", a song by Amy MacDonald from her 2007 album This is The Life
 "Caledonia", a song by Robin Trower from his 1976 album Long Misty Days

Transport

Airlines
 Caledonian Airways, Scottish airline formed in 1961
 Caledonian Airways (1988), charter airline, formed after British Airways acquired British Caledonian
 British Caledonian, airline, formed in 1970 from a merger of Caledonian Airways and British United Airways

Railways
 Caledonian Railway, early 19th century Scottish railway
 Caledonian Railway (Brechin), private company formed by steam railway enthusiasts
 Caledonia, Manx Northern No. 4, later Isle of Man Railway No.15 Steam Locomotive, built in 1885
 Caledonian Sleeper, train service operated by ScotRail

Ships
Caledonia (ship), a list of ships with the name
, various ships and bases of the Royal Navy
, various ships of the United States Navy
Caledonian (ship), a list of ships with the name

Schools
 Caledonia High School, in Caledonia, Minnesota
 Caledonia High School (Ontario), in Caledonia, Ontario
 Caledonia Junior High School, Dartmouth, Nova Scotia
 Caledonia Senior Secondary School, in Terrace, British Columbia
 College of New Caledonia, in British Columbia
 Glasgow Caledonian University, in Glasgow, Scotland

Sports
 Caledonia AIA, soccer team from Trinidad and Tobago
 Caledonia Corvairs, Canadian junior ice hockey team based in Caledonia, Ontario
 Caledonia F.C., also known as Caledonian F.C. or Caleys, former U.S. soccer team from Detroit, Michigan
 Caledonian Stadium in Inverness, Scotland
 Inverness Caledonian Thistle F.C., Scottish soccer team
 North Caledonian Football League, amateur league in the Scottish highlands
 Royal Caledonian Curling Club, governing body of curling in Scotland

Structures
 Caledonia Bridge (disambiguation)
 Caledonia Bridge (Caledonia, North Dakota)
 Caledonia Building, historic commercial building in Holyoke, Massachusetts
 Caledonia Dam, also known as the Grand River Dam, in Caledonia, Ontario, Canada
 Caledonia Farm, also known as Fountain Hall, historic home at Flint Hall, Rappahannock County, Virginia
 Caledonia House Hotel, also known as the Masonic Temple, historic hotel at Caledonia in Livingston County, New York
 Caledonia Mill, historic mill building in Caledonia, Ontario, Canada
 Caledonia State Prison Farm, North Carolina
 Star of Caledonia, a proposed sculpture near Gretna, Dumfries and Galloway, Scotland

Other uses
 Caledonia (typeface)
 Caledonia Consulting, public affairs and communications firm in Edinburgh, Scotland
 Caledonia Investments, an investment trust on the London Stock Exchange
 Caledonian Brewery, formed in 1869 in Edinburgh
 Caledonian orogeny, a mountain building event that occurred during the Palaeozoic Era
 Caledonia, a junior synonym of Scotinotylus, a genus of spiders

See also
 New Caledonia (disambiguation)
 Scotland (disambiguation)
 Scotia (disambiguation)
 Caledon (disambiguation)